Evenes is a municipality in Nordland county, Norway. It is part of the traditional district of Ofoten. The administrative centre of the municipality is the village of Bogen. Other villages in Evenes include Liland, Tårstad, Dragvik, and the village of Evenes.

The  municipality is the 285th largest by area out of the 356 municipalities in Norway. Evenes is the 307th most populous municipality in Norway with a population of 1,334.

General information

The municipality of Evindnæs was established on 1 January 1884 when the old Ofoten Municipality was split into two new municipalities: Evindnæs and Ankenes. Initially, Evindnæs had 2,397 residents. The spelling was later changed from Evindnæs to Evenes. On 1 January 1912, the southern part of Trondenes Municipality in Troms county (population: 291) was transferred to Evenes (and Nordland county). On 1 July 1925, the southern district of Evenes on the south side of the Ofotfjorden (population: 3,270) was separated to become the new Ballangen Municipality. This left Evenes with 2,323 residents.

During the 1960s, there were many municipal mergers across Norway due to the work of the Schei Committee. On 1 January 1964, the small, unpopulated Ramnes area in western Evenes was transferred to the neighboring Tjeldsund Municipality. On 1 January 1999, the small Veggen area of Narvik Municipality (population: 9) was transferred to Evenes Municipality.

Name
The municipality (originally the parish) is named after the old Evenes farm since the first Evenes Church was built there. The first element is (probably) the genitive case of the male name . Historically, the name was spelled Evindnæs.

Coat of arms
The coat of arms was granted on 12 January 1990. The official blazon is "Gules, a wheel argent". This means the arms have a red field (background) and the charge is a wagon wheel. The wheel has a tincture of argent which means it is commonly colored white, but if it is made out of metal, then silver is used. The wheel was chosen as a symbol for Evenes as a center of communication and transportation for the region. The arms were designed by Per Hartvigsen after the idea by Aina Heidal from Evenes.

Churches
The Church of Norway has one parish within the municipality of Evenes. It is part of the Ofoten prosti (deanery) in the Diocese of Sør-Hålogaland.

Geography

Evenes is located on the northern shore of the Ofotfjorden, and borders Tjeldsund Municipality (in Troms county) to the west and north and Narvik Municipality to the east and south (across the fjord).

There are lowlands in the western part of the municipality (Liland and Evenes area), while in the eastern part (Bogen), the mountains go almost straight up from the fjord. The highest mountain is Lilletinden, which can be climbed without climbing equipment, even with skis in the winter and early spring. The view is stunning.

The most noticeable mountain when driving on the European route E10 highway, which crosses through Evenes, is perhaps the steep Niingen just east of Bogen. Strandvatnet lake next to Bogen village is surrounded by mountains and is a relatively rare Meromictic lake. There is trout in most lakes in Evenes, and Arctic char spawns in Østervikvatnet (lake) a few kilometres east of Bogen. Niingsvatnet is partly located in Evenes.

The large cave Trollkirka (the Troll Church) is located in the western part of the municipality (near Tårstad). German fortifications from World War II can be seen at Evenestangen, which is also a good place for fishing in the fjord.

Evenestangen is also the site of the sculpture Stone House by Danish artist Bjørn Nørgaard. The sculpture is part of the Artscape Nordland project.

Climate
The weather station at Evenes airport has been recording since 1973, showing a boreal climate (Dfc/subarctic) with milder winters than typical for this climate zone. The all-time high  was recorded 18 July 2018. The warmest month on record was July 2014 with mean  and average daily high . The coldest month in recent decades was February 2007 with mean  and average daily low . 
The wettest season is autumn and winter and the driest is March - July, a pattern more typical of oceanic climates.

Government
All municipalities in Norway, including Evenes, are responsible for primary education (through 10th grade), outpatient health services, senior citizen services, unemployment and other social services, zoning, economic development, and municipal roads. The municipality is governed by a municipal council of elected representatives, which in turn elect a mayor. The municipality falls under the Ofoten District Court and the Hålogaland Court of Appeal.

Municipal council
The municipal council of Evenes is made up of 17 representatives that are elected to four-year terms. The party breakdown of the council is as follows:

Mayors
The mayors of Evenes:

 1884–1910: Jakob J. Anderssen (V)
 1911-1919: Peter Lind Ingebrigtsen (LL)
 1920-1925: John Magnus Østvik (Bp)  
 1925-1925: Hans Olsen Tofte (Bp)  
 1926-1928: Peter Lind Ingebrigtsen (LL)
 1931-1934: Hans Olsen Tofte (Bp)  
 1935-1939: Kristian H. Lenvik (Ap)
 1939-1940: Oscar Nikolai Jenssen (Ap)
 1941-1945: Villas Ravn (NS)
 1945-1947: Kristian Elvheim (Ap)
 1948-1951: Sverre Agersborg (H)
 1952–1955: Daniel Danielsen (Ap)
 1956–1959: Kristian Andersen (Bp)
 1960–1963: Ingvald Monsen (Ap)
 1964–1967: Oddmund Lind (Sp)
 1968-1968: Birger Persen (Ap)
 1969–1971: Hans Ingemar Kristiansen (Ap)
 1971-1978: Nilberg Andersen (Sp)
 1978–1979: Rolf Moholt (Ap)
 1979–1983: Arne Michalsen (H)
 1983-1989: Rolf Moholt (Ap)
 1989-1991: Bjørnar Olsen (Ap)
 1991-2003: Brynjulf Hansen (Sp)
 2003-2013: Jardar Jensen (H)
 2013-2018: Svein Erik Kristiansen (H)
 2018-2019: Sisilja Viksund (H)
 2019-present: Terje Bartholsen (Ap)

Economy

Most people work in public services and there is also some small-scale agriculture.

Harstad-Narvik Airport (international airport) is located in the western part of the municipality, with daily flights to Oslo, Trondheim, Bodø, Tromsø and Andenes, as well as charter flights to southern Europe filled with sun-hungry tourists. The Royal Norwegian Air Force has a substantial infrastructure at Evenes, but the base was closed following the end of the Cold War, though it is often used by other NATO allies during their winter training. The large C-5 Galaxy from the United States Air Force has made several landings at the airport. The United States Navy moved the hospital to Kuwait before the Gulf War started in 1991. This harbour was also built with funds from NATO, to enable heavy equipment to be moved north to Troms by road.

History

The Evenes Church was the first church in Ofoten, built about the year 1250. The original church and a subsequent church has been lost in fires; the present church is a wooden church (built in 1800) inspired by Danish Biedermeier mansion building style. Some relics from the original churches remain in the church today, most notably a stone baptismal font from the 13th century.

Liland used to be the commercial centre of the entire Ofotfjord area right up until the emergence of Narvik as a commerce/industry centre in the early 20th century.

During World War II, the Germans found the wide and fairly deep Bogen bay, with its mostly hard rock bottom well suited for anchoring, to be perfect for a naval base. Narvik is only  to the east (further into the fjord). The German battleship Tirpitz and cruiser Admiral Hipper were stationed in Bogen during part of the war (8 July – 23 October 1942, returned 11 March 1943). The battleships Scharnhorst and Lützow were based in Bogen for a shorter time. Additionally, several destroyers and submarines used Bogen as a base for shorter periods. Thus, this bay was one of Germany's most powerful naval bases during parts of the war and constituted a very real threat to Allied Arctic Convoys. The Allies had an obvious need for intelligence about these powerful German warships, and the British provided a radio set to the local resistance group. This radio was set up at Liland, 9 km west of Bogen, and codenamed Lyra.

Notable people 
 Jens Martin Arctander Jenssen (1885 Evenes – 1968) a Norwegian politician, teacher and librarian
 Terje Wold (1899 in Evenes – 1972) a Norwegian judge and politician; from 1958 to 1969 he was the 15th Chief Justice of the Supreme Court of Norway
 Alf Rekstad (born 1951 in Bogen, Evenes) a Norwegian speed skater, competed in the 10,000m. at the 1980 Winter Olympics
 Jens Fredrik Ryland (born 1974) a Norwegian guitarist with the progressive black metal band Borknagar; brought up in Evenes

References

External links
Municipal fact sheet from Statistics Norway 

Gallery with old pictures from Evenes
Pictures and information from Evenes 
Pictures of Tirpitz and Admiral Hipper in Bogen 
Pictures from a kayak trip in Evenes
Nautå nature reserve 
Veggen nature reserve  

 
Municipalities of Nordland
Populated places of Arctic Norway
1884 establishments in Norway